George Congreve (born 30 December 1999) is a New Zealand speedway rider.

Career
Congreve started riding speedway at the age of 12, at the Moore Park track in Christchurch. He began riding 500cc machines when he was 16, and he won the New Zealand Under 21 championship three times in 2018-19, 2019-20 and 2020-21.  

Congreve was third at the 2020-21 New Zealand Solo Championship, and became the national champion in the 2022-23 season.

In 2022, he began his British league career, signing for Newcastle Diamonds in the SGB Championship 2022, but unfortunately, the team withdrew from the league in June, leaving Congreve without a club. He did, however, continue to ride as a member of the Weymouth Wildcats team in meetings at the Isle of Wight. Congreve has joined Mildenhall Fen Tigers for the 2023 National Development League speedway season, and the Wightlink Warriors in the Nora League.

References 

1999 births
Living people
New Zealand speedway riders
Mildenhall Fen Tigers riders
Newcastle Diamonds riders
Sportspeople from Christchurch